Burmattus is a genus of Asian jumping spiders that was first described by Jerzy Prószyński in 1992. The name is derived from "Burma", and "-attus", a common suffix for salticid genera.

Species
 it contains four species, found only in Asia:
Burmattus albopunctatus (Thorell, 1895) – Myanmar
Burmattus pachytibialis Prószyński & Deeleman-Reinhold, 2010 – Indonesia (Sumbawa)
Burmattus pococki (Thorell, 1895) (type) – Myanmar, Thailand, Vietnam, China, Japan
Burmattus sinicus Prószyński, 1992 – China

References

Salticidae
Salticidae genera
Spiders of Asia